Norma Leah Nelson McCorvey (September 22, 1947 – February 18, 2017), also known by the pseudonym "Jane Roe", was the plaintiff in the landmark American legal case Roe v. Wade in which the U.S. Supreme Court ruled in 1973 that individual state laws banning abortion were unconstitutional.

Later in her life, McCorvey became an Evangelical Protestant and in her remaining years, a Roman Catholic, and took part in the anti-abortion movement. McCorvey stated then that her involvement in Roe was "the biggest mistake of [her] life". However, in the Nick Sweeney documentary AKA Jane Roe, McCorvey said, in what she called her "deathbed confession", that "she never really supported the antiabortion movement" and that she had been paid for her anti-abortion sentiments.

Early life
McCorvey was born in Simmesport, Louisiana, and spent her early childhood at her family's residence in Lettsworth in Pointe Coupee Parish. Later in her childhood, the family moved to Houston. McCorvey's father, Olin Nelson, a TV repairman, left the family when McCorvey was 13 years old, and her parents subsequently divorced. She and her older brother were raised by their mother, Mary (née Gautreaux), a violent alcoholic. McCorvey's father died on December 28, 1995. McCorvey's mother was raised a Pentecostal but McCorvey's father led her and the family as Jehovah's Witnesses.

McCorvey had trouble with the law that began at the age of ten, when she robbed the cash register at a gas station and ran away to Oklahoma City with a friend. They tricked a hotel worker into letting them rent a room, and were there for two days when a maid walked in on her and her female friend kissing. McCorvey was arrested and taken to court, where she was declared a ward of the state and a judge sent her to a Catholic boarding school, though she didn't become Catholic until 1998.

Later, McCorvey was sent to the State School for Girls in Gainesville, Texas, on and off from ages 11 to 15. She said this was the happiest time of her childhood, and every time she was sent home, would purposely do something bad to be sent back. After being released, McCorvey lived with her mother's cousin, who allegedly raped her every night for three weeks. When McCorvey's mother found out, her cousin said McCorvey was lying.

While working at a restaurant, Norma met Woody McCorvey (born 1940), and she married him at the age of 16 in 1963. She later left him after he allegedly assaulted her. She moved in with her mother and gave birth to her first child, Melissa, in 1965. After Melissa's birth, McCorvey developed a severe drinking and drug problem. Soon after, she began identifying as a lesbian. In her book, she stated that she went on a weekend trip to visit two friends and left her baby with her mother. When she returned, her mother replaced Melissa with a baby doll and reported Norma to the police as having abandoned her baby, and called the police to take her out of the house. She would not tell her where Melissa was for weeks, and finally let her visit her child after three months. She allowed McCorvey to move back in. One day, she woke McCorvey up after a long day of work; she told McCorvey to sign what were presented as insurance papers, and she did so without reading them. However, the papers she had signed were adoption papers, giving her mother custody of Melissa, and McCorvey was then kicked out of the house. Her mother disputed that version of the events, and said that McCorvey had agreed to the adoption.

The following year, McCorvey again became pregnant and gave birth to a baby, Jennifer, who was placed for adoption.

Roe v. Wade

In 1969, at the age of 21, McCorvey became pregnant a third time and returned to Dallas. According to McCorvey, friends advised her that she should assert falsely that she had been raped by a group of black men and that she could thereby obtain a legal abortion under Texas's law, which prohibited most abortion; sources differ over whether Texas law had such a rape exception. Due to a lack of police evidence or documentation, the scheme was not successful, and McCorvey later said it was a fabrication. She attempted to obtain an illegal abortion, but the recommended clinic had been closed down by authorities. Her doctor, Richard Lane, suggested that she consult Henry McCluskey, an adoption lawyer in Dallas. McCorvey stated that she was only interested in an abortion, but agreed to meet with McCluskey.

Eventually, McCorvey was referred to attorneys Linda Coffee and Sarah Weddington, who were looking for pregnant women who were seeking abortions. The case, Roe v. Wade (Henry Wade was the district attorney), took three years of trials to reach the Supreme Court of the United States, and McCorvey never attended a single trial. During the course of the lawsuit, McCorvey gave birth and placed the baby for adoption. McCorvey told the press that she was "Jane Roe" soon after the decision was reached, stating that she had sought an abortion because she was unemployable and greatly depressed. In 1983, McCorvey told the press that she had been raped; in 1987, she said the rape claim was untrue.

McCorvey's third child 

In 2021, Shelley Lynn Thornton, McCorvey's third child, stated she was "neither pro-life nor pro-choice". She grew up not knowing that she was the fetus at the center of the Roe case until her birth mother appeared on the Today show in 1989 and spoke of her desire to meet her daughter. In response, a journalist for the National Enquirer found Thornton as a teenager and told her about her prenatal history, which greatly upset her. In 1991, Thornton became pregnant and did not have an abortion because abortion was "not part of who I was". By 2021, she had met her two half-siblings, but not her birth mother. On the phone in 1994, according to Thornton, McCorvey told her that she should have thanked her for not having an abortion. Thornton's visceral reaction was "What! I'm supposed to thank you for getting knocked up... and then giving me away?" She told her birth mother that she "would never, ever thank her for not aborting me". She reflected that "When someone's pregnant with a baby, and they don't want that baby, that person develops knowing they're not wanted."

Anti-abortion activism
In 1994, McCorvey published her autobiography, I Am Roe. At a book signing, McCorvey was befriended by Flip Benham, an evangelical minister and the national director of the anti-abortion organization Operation Rescue. She converted to Evangelical Protestantism and was baptized on August 8, 1995, by Benham, in a Dallas, Texas, backyard swimming pool—an event that was filmed for national television. Two days later, she announced that she had quit her job at an abortion clinic and had become an advocate of Operation Rescue's campaign to make abortion illegal. She voiced remorse for her part in the Supreme Court decision and said she had been a pawn for abortion activists.

On August 17, 1998, McCorvey was received into the Catholic Church in a Mass celebrated by Father Edward Robinson and concelebrated by Father Frank Pavone, director of Priests for Life, at Saint Thomas Aquinas Church in Dallas. McCorvey's second book, Won by Love, described her religious conversion and was published in 1998. In the book, she said that her change of heart occurred in 1995, when she saw a fetal development poster in an Operation Rescue office.

In 2004, McCorvey sought to have the U.S. Supreme Court overturn Roe v. Wade, saying that there was now evidence that the procedure harms women, but the case was ultimately dismissed in 2005. On January 22, 2008, McCorvey endorsed Republican presidential candidate Ron Paul because of his anti-abortion position.

McCorvey remained active in anti-abortion demonstrations, including one she participated in before President Barack Obama's commencement address to the graduates of the University of Notre Dame. McCorvey was arrested on the first day of U.S. Senate hearings for the confirmation to the Supreme Court of the United States of Sonia Sotomayor after McCorvey and another protester began shouting during Senator Al Franken's opening statement. McCorvey appeared in the 2013 film Doonby, in which she delivers an anti-abortion message. She is also the subject of Joshua Prager's 2021 book, The Family Roe: An American Story.

Relationship with Connie Gonzalez
Soon after giving birth a third time, as Roe v. Wade made its way through the courts, McCorvey met and began a long-term relationship with Connie Gonzalez. They lived together in Dallas for 35 years.

After converting to Catholicism, McCorvey continued to live with Gonzalez, though she described their relationship as platonic. Later in life, McCorvey stated that she was no longer a lesbian, although she later said that her religious conversion to Evangelical Christianity and  renouncement of her sexuality were financially motivated. McCorvey moved out of the house she shared with Gonzalez in 2006, shortly after Gonzalez suffered a stroke.

Death
Norma McCorvey died of heart failure in Katy, Texas, on February 18, 2017, at the age of 69.

AKA Jane Roe documentary

On May 22, 2020, a documentary titled AKA Jane Roe aired on FX, describing McCorvey's life and the financial incentives to change her views on abortion. In an interview conducted for the film shortly before her death, in what she referred to as her "deathbed confession", McCorvey said her anti-abortion activism had been "all an act", which she did because she was paid, stating that she did not care whether a woman got an abortion. "I was the big fish. I think it was a mutual thing. I took their money and they'd put me out in front of the cameras and tell me what to say. That's what I'd say," McCorvey said. "If a young woman wants to have an abortion, that's no skin off my ass. That's why they call it choice," she added.

Robert Schenck, a formerly anti-abortion evangelical pastor who worked with McCorvey, verified the claim made in the documentary of McCorvey receiving financial compensation. He acknowledged that his group paid McCorvey to speak against abortion, stating: "Her name and photo would command some of the largest windfalls of dollars for my group and many others, but the money we gave her was modest. More than once, I tried to make up for it with an added check, but it was never fair." According to tax documents, McCorvey received at least $450,000 from anti-abortion groups during her years as an activist. Schenck said that he was surprised that McCorvey said she favored abortion rights, although he said that he knew she "harboured doubts about the pro-life message she was telegraphing".

Pavone, who had a decades long association with McCorvey, said that she was not on the payroll of his organization, Priests for Life, and said that he did not believe that McCorvey's activism was disingenuous saying, "I can even see her being emotionally cornered to get those words out of her mouth, but the things that I saw in 22 years with her—the thousands and thousands of conversations that we had—that was real." He later wrote, "So abortion supporters are claiming Norma McCorvey, the Jane Roe of Roe v. Wade, wasn't sincere in her conversion. She was. I was her spiritual guide for 22 years, received her into the Catholic Church, kept regular contact, spoke with her the day she died, and conducted her funeral." Abby Johnson, who worked for Planned Parenthood before joining the anti-abortion movement, said that McCorvey called her on the phone days before her death to express remorse for abortion. Johnson said that she believed McCorvey was a damaged woman who should not have been thrust into the spotlight so quickly after turning against abortion saying, "I don't have any problem believing that in the last year of her life that she tried to convince herself abortion was OK. But I know at the end of her life, she did not believe that."

Books

References

External links
 Norma McCorvey speaking at the 1998 March for Life (C-SPAN)

1947 births
2017 deaths
20th-century American non-fiction writers
20th-century American women writers
Activists for African-American civil rights
American autobiographers
American people of Acadian descent
Cajun people
Former feminists
American anti-abortion activists
Bisexual women
Converts to Protestantism from atheism or agnosticism
Converts to Roman Catholicism from Evangelicalism
Former Jehovah's Witnesses
People from Avoyelles Parish, Louisiana
People from Houston
People self-identified as ex-gay
Roman Catholic activists
Writers from Houston
Writers from Louisiana
Women autobiographers
Activists from Texas
American women non-fiction writers
Catholics from Texas
Catholics from Louisiana
LGBT people from Louisiana
Writers from Texas
21st-century American women